The 1953 Tour de Suisse was the 17th edition of the Tour de Suisse cycle race and was held from 17 June to 27 June 1953. The race started and finished in Zürich. The race was won by Hugo Koblet.

General classification

References

1953
1953 in Swiss sport
1953 Challenge Desgrange-Colombo